Anouchka Besch (born 29 October 1999) is a Luxembourgish footballer who plays as a forward and has appeared for the Luxembourg women's national team.

Career
Besch has been capped for the Luxembourg national team, appearing for the team during the 2019 FIFA Women's World Cup qualifying cycle.

References

External links
 
 
 

1999 births
Living people
Luxembourgian women's footballers
Luxembourg women's international footballers
Women's association football forwards